Dream Girl (Nura Nal) is a superhero appearing in books published by DC Comics, primarily as a member of the Legion of Super-Heroes in the 30th and 31st centuries. She was created by writer Edmond Hamilton and artist John Forte, and first appeared in Adventure Comics #317 (1964).

Fictional character biography

Original version
Nura's home planet is Naltor, where virtually all the inhabitants possess precognitive abilities. After foreseeing the deaths of several Legionnaires, she crafted an elaborate plan to save their lives. As part of that plan, she used Naltorian science, of which she was an expert, to change the powers of Ayla Ranzz from lightning casting to the ability to make objects super lightweight. For many years thereafter, Ayla, who had been known as Lightning Lass, became Light Lass.

The Legionnaires she foresaw dying were actually robot doubles. Having joined the team under false pretenses, she left the Legion temporarily and became a member of the Legion of Substitute Heroes. There she was reunited with Star Boy, with whom she had become romantically involved. Star Boy had previously been expelled from the Legion for the self-defense killing of Nura's former love, Naltorian Kenz Nahor, who had tried to kill Star Boy over jealousy of his relationship with Nura.

Years later, Dream Girl served as Legion leader (only the second female Legionnaire to do so), with her first mission being perhaps the Legion's greatest challenge: defending the United Planets from an assault by the ancient villain Darkseid. Her sister Mysa, the White Witch, also served as a Legionnaire. Her mother Kiwa Nal was the High Seer of Naltor (Naltor's leader); the identity of her father was unrevealed.

Dream Girl's mastery of Naltorian science placed her in an elite group. Among the Legionnaires, her scientific prowess was surpassed only by Brainiac 5 and the original Invisible Kid, and perhaps equaled only by Mon-El. Additionally, she compensated for the non-physical nature of her powers by engaging in numerous training sessions with Karate Kid. Eventually, no Legionnaire was more skilled in nonpowered hand-to-hand combat except Karate Kid himself and Timber Wolf.

Reboot version
After the events of the Zero Hour mini-series, the Legion's continuity was completely rebooted. The second version of Nura claimed that her name was Nura Schappin, changing her surname to Nal because, as she put it: "It just says I'm from Naltor y'know". She also claimed to have been the first precognitive to be born on Naltor in seven generations, a claim that was later contradicted by other post-Zero Hour Legion stories.

For most of this continuity's duration, Nura was not a Legionnaire, although she was still Star Boy's girlfriend. Additionally, she suffered from narcolepsy, falling unconscious whenever she had a vision. She was no longer the sister of Mysa, who was completely unrelated to her in this continuity. Eventually, Nura gained Legion membership under the codename Dreamer, shortly before the Legion's continuity was rebooted again in 2005.

2005 reboot
In the 2005 reboot, her codename returned to Dream Girl. In this continuity, she sometimes loses track of events in the present when tracking a future event (she once failed to get involved in a fight because she thought it had already happened).

Brainiac 5 was initially shown as resenting her ability to simply "know" things that he had to deduce, and he once questions her abilities. Her response is a prediction that they would be married.

She later appears to have been killed in battle; however, Brainiac 5 places her body in stasis and works to revive her. Although he fails to fully resurrect her, she becomes a spirit with the ability to appear to anyone in their dreams or daydreams.

At first dismissed as a delusion in the mind of the grieving Brainiac 5 (he even claims that his "Nura" may be a facet of his intuitive subconscious, appearing to him while daydreaming in a form suited to appease his tastes), Nura's presence in Brainiac 5 mind becomes a well-known fact, worrying Princess Projectra, who, in a bid to destroy the Legion for their inability to save Orando, fears Nura's precognitive sight. When Brainiac 5 has a female spirit medium channel Nura's mind enough to share some physical intimacy, Projectra uses her powers on the id to have the inhibitions and urges in Brainiac 5's mind viciously attack Nura when she returns to his body. Despite Querl's valiant effort to control them, the urges gouge out Nura's eyes, blinding her at a spiritual level, stripping the girl of both her physical and precognitive sight, a fate to which she is quietly resigned, as long as she can still be with her lover. Nura is later revived by Brainiac 5 by transferring her consciousness back in a renewed, cloned version of her original body, restoring her powers and sight. They both decide to go on with their marriage.

Nura is replaced in the Legion by a male Naltorian named Rol Purtha, a.k.a. Dream Boy.

Post-Infinite Crisis
The events of the 2005–2006 "Infinite Crisis" storyline apparently restored a close analogue of the Pre-Crisis Legion continuity, as seen in "The Lightning Saga" story arc in Justice League of America and Justice Society of America, and in the "Superman and the Legion of Super-Heroes" story arc in Action Comics. Dream Girl is included in their number. In this incarnation, her powers are implied to be linked to the realm of the Dreaming, ruled by Dream of the Endless. It is later revealed that Dream Girl somehow passed on her prophetic knowledge to Thom Kallor.

In "The Lightning Saga" storyline, Dream Girl was one of the Legionnaires sent to the 21st Century to capture the essence of Bart Allen in a lightning rod before his death. She was found within Arkham Asylum as a prisoner of Dr. Destiny, who used her powers as his new "dreamstone".

Dream Girl is among the missing Legion members as of the "Superman and the Legion of Super-Heroes" storyline. In that story and in the subsequent Legion of 3 Worlds miniseries, it is revealed that Dream Girl had prophetic visions of Superboy-Prime as the harbinger of a "Crisis of the 31st Century", which prompted Brainiac 5 to concoct the contingency plan to defeat Prime, including the resurrection of Bart Allen.

Dream Girl last appeared in a preview in Adventure Comics (vol. 2) #1, seemingly back in the 21st Century and imprisoned in a device.

Post-Rebirth
In the 2019 reboot of the Legion of Super-Heroes, when Nura Nal is recruited as a Legionnaire and is nicknamed Dream Girl, at first they questioned the use of "girl", showing that they don't necessarily see themself in that gender, but ended up agreeing. Although recognized as a woman, Nura is referred to with the gender neutral pronoun "they".

Powers and abilities
Like all natives of Naltor, Nura has the power to see the future and experience visions in dreams; she is rated one of the most powerful precognitives on the planet. Her hand-to-hand fighting skills—having trained with Karate Kid—combined with her ability to glimpse seconds into the future, made her a formidable short-term opponent in battle, capable of taking on The Persuader, but the sheer number of expanding possible futures in each second of a battle made it difficult for her to keep the advantage. Her precognitive abilities also give her an edge in strategic planning.

Nura is a skilled scientist, specializing in biology; when Brainiac 5 quits the Legion after being acquitted of murdering the Infinite Man, team leader Polar Boy asks her to consider becoming the Legion's chief scientist. She is highly charismatic, capable of convincing men and women to do what she wants, and guided the Legion as leader through Darkseid's awakening in the Legion's time.

Equipment
As a member of the Legion of Super-Heroes, she is provided a Legion Flight Ring, which allows her to fly and protects her from the vacuum of space and other dangerous environments. On at least one occasion, she was able to exert her extraordinary willpower to extend the ring's anti-gravity power to other objects, as if using telekinesis.

Other versions
Nura Nal is featured in the Smallville Season 11 digital comic based on the TV series.

In other media
 Dream Girl made a cameo appearance in the Superman: The Animated Series episode "New Kids in Town".
 Dream Girl appears in Legion of Super Heroes, voiced by Tara Platt. She has a prominent role in the episode "In Your Dreams", helping predict where the Dark Circle will strike, and later being kidnapped by the Circle, who attempt to use her abilities to their advantage.
 Nia Nal / Dreamer, a character inspired by and depicted as the ancestor of Nura Nal / Dream Girl, appears in the fourth season of The CW series Supergirl and is portrayed by Nicole Maines. She is the first transgender superhero on television.

References

External links
 A Hero History Of Dream Girl
 Dream Girl of the Legion of Super-Heroes, the Silver Age Dream Girl

Characters created by Edmond Hamilton
Characters created by John Forte
Comics characters introduced in 1964
DC Comics aliens
DC Comics extraterrestrial superheroes
DC Comics female superheroes
DC Comics LGBT superheroes 
DC Comics characters who have mental powers
Fictional characters with precognition
Fictional characters with retrocognition
Fictional non-binary people